"Nothing Left for Me" is a song by Slovene duo Maraaya. This is their fourth single released on 27 February 2016 at the Slovenia in the Eurovision Song Contest 2016 final night.

Credits and personnel 

Raay – music, producer
Marjetka Vovk – lyrics, vocals

Charts

Release history

References 

2016 songs
2016 singles